Sean, Shaun or Shawn Johnson may refer to:

Sean Johnson (soccer) (born 1989), American soccer player
Sean Johnson (bowls) (born 1972), New Zealand lawn bowler
Sean C. Johnson, American Christian musician
Sean Cw Johnson, American actor known for Power Rangers Lightspeed Rescue
Shaun Johnson (born 1990), New Zealand rugby league player
Shawn Johnson East (born 1992), née Johnson, American gymnast
Sean 'Sweet' Johnson, Grand Theft Auto video game character

See also
LeShon Johnson (born 1971), American football player
Sean Johnston, Canadian writer
Shaun Johnston, Canadian actor